Günther's dwarf gecko (Lygodactylus miops) is a species of gecko endemic to Madagascar.

References

Lygodactylus
Reptiles described in 1891
Reptiles of Madagascar
Endemic fauna of Madagascar
Taxa named by Albert Günther